The 2021 Silverstone Formula 2 round was the fourth round of the 2021 Formula 2 Championship and took place at the Silverstone Circuit from 16 to 18 July. It ran in support of the 2021 British Grand Prix and featured three races, which were won by Robert Shwartzman, Richard Verschoor, who took his first ever win in Formula 2, and Guanyu Zhou respectively.

Classification

Qualifying

Sprint race 1

Sprint race 2

Feature Race

Standings after the event 

Drivers' Championship standings

Teams' Championship standings

 Note: Only the top five positions are included for both sets of standings.

See also 
2021 British Grand Prix

References

External links 

 

Silverstone
SIlverstone Formula 2
Silverstone Formula 2